Scott "Scotty" Miller (born 18 May 1972 in Perth, Western Australia) is an Australian retired football player, who is the coach of Cockburn City Football Club.

Club career
He last played as a left full back for the Australian A-League club Perth Glory. He earned 2 caps for the Australian national team and was an inaugural player for the Perth Glory in 1996.

Managerial career

Perth Glory
In July 2013, Miller re-joined Glory's coaching staff, signing on for two seasons. On 17 June 2014, he was axed from Perth Glory, along with Gareth Naven, after a review of the coaching structure.

Cockburn City
Ahead of the 2016 season, Miller returned to his head coach role at Cockburn City.

References

External links
 OzFootball profile
 

1972 births
Living people
Soccer players from Perth, Western Australia
Australian soccer players
Australia international soccer players
A-League Men players
National Soccer League (Australia) players
Perth Glory FC players
Association football defenders
Sorrento FC players
Gippsland Falcons players